Grove may refer to:

 Grove (nature), a small group of trees

Places

England
Grove, Buckinghamshire, a village
Grove, Dorset
Grove, Herefordshire
Grove, Kent
Grove, Nottinghamshire, a village
Grove, Oxfordshire, a village and civil parish
 Hazel Grove, Stockport, a suburb
The Grove, County Durham, a village
The Groves, York, a suburb

United States
 Grove, Maine
 Grove, Maryland, an unincorporated community
 Grove, New York, a town
 Grove, Oklahoma, a city
 Grove, Virginia, an unincorporated community
Grove, West Virginia
 Grove Township (disambiguation), various townships

Elsewhere
 Grove, Tasmania, Australia, a suburb
 Grove, Germany, a municipality in Schleswig-Holstein
 Grove, County Leitrim, a townland in Ireland
 O Grove, Galicia, Spain, a municipality
 Grove (crater), on the Moon

Schools
Grove Primary School (disambiguation)
Grove Academy

Other uses
Grove (surname)
, a Second World War destroyer
Grove Press, American alternative book publisher
Grove Cranes, crane truck manufacturer acquired by Manitowoc Cranes
Grove Racing, an Australian motor racing team
Sacred grove, a grove with religious importance

See also
 
 Groove (disambiguation)
 Grove cell, a type of electric battery
 Grove's Dictionary (disambiguation)
 Groves (disambiguation)
 Grove City (disambiguation)
 Grove Park (disambiguation)
 The Grove (disambiguation)